Milenge is a settlement in the Luapula Province of Zambia, and headquarters of Milenge District. It consists of the boma housing the district council and offices, with a village of a few thousand people on the dirt road which runs from Chembe Ferry in the west.

See also
Luapula Province
Luapula River

Populated places in Luapula Province